Mir Fazlollah (also Romanized as Mīr Faẕlollāh and Mīr Fazlollāh; also known as Mīr Feyẕollāh) is a village in Titkanlu Rural District, Khabushan District, Faruj County, North Khorasan Province, Iran. At the 2006 census, its population was 109, in 28 families.

References 

Populated places in Faruj County